Mark Pitura (born 26 June 1974) is a former Australian rules footballer who played for Richmond in the Australian Football League (AFL) in 1993. He was recruited by Richmond from the Turvey Park Football Club in the Riverina Football League. He is the son of former South Melbourne and Richmond player, John Pitura.

After playing two games for Richmond in 1993, he spent 1995 playing for the Essendon reserves. In the 1996 Pre-season Draft, Collingwood drafted Pitura with the 9th selection but he did not play a league game for Collingwood and was delisted mid-way through the 1996 season.

References

External links

Living people
1974 births
Richmond Football Club players
Sturt Football Club players
Australian rules footballers from New South Wales
Australian people of Polish descent